Sand Ridge is an unincorporated community in Luce Township, Spencer County, in the U.S. state of Indiana.

History
Sand Ridge took its name from a sandy ridge near the original town site.

Geography

References

Unincorporated communities in Spencer County, Indiana
Unincorporated communities in Indiana